The Mexico Pavilion is a  Mexican-themed pavilion that is part of the World Showcase, within Epcot at the Walt Disney World in Bay Lake, Florida, United States. Its location is next to the Norway pavilion.

Layout
The Mexico Pavilion resembles a Mesoamerican pyramid with steps leading to entrance doors. Visitors enter through a gallery display of Mexican artwork, the "Animales Fantásticos" art collection. The central indoor area of the pavilion is themed as an outdoor twilight-lit Mexican village and marketplace, Plaza de los Amigos. At the edge of the plaza, a restaurant, San Ángel Inn Restaurante, overlooks an indoor lagoon with a themed backdrop of another pyramid and a smoldering volcano in the distance with themed lighting and smoke effects. To the side of the plaza, a boarding area leads to a boat ride, Gran Fiesta Tour Starring The Three Caballeros which commences in the indoor lagoon area.

Due to the location and height of the outdoor structure of the pavilion, the nightly fireworks show Harmonious is controlled from a small technical office atop the building.

Attractions and services

Attractions
 Gran Fiesta Tour Starring The Three Caballeros - 2007 – present.
 DuckTales World Showcase Adventure - 2022 - present.

Former Attractions
 El Río del Tiempo (The River of Time) - (1982-2007). (Replaced by Gran Fiesta Tour in 2007)
 Kim Possible World Showcase Adventure - (2009-2012).
Agent P World Showcase Adventure - (2012-2020)

Dining
 San Angel Inn Restaurante - an indoor table-service restaurant located in the central plaza of the pavilion, the restaurant is the sibling to Mexico City's restaurant of the same name, which dates back to 1692.
 La Hacienda de San Ángel - a lakeside indoor table-service restaurant, opened in September 2010.
 Cantina de San Ángel - a lakeside counter-service location with casual outdoor seating.
 La Cava del Tequila - a tequila bar with a vast collection of tequilas, specialty margaritas and light Mexican appetizers, hosted by tequila "connoisseurs" that interact with park guests. Located adjacent to San Angel Inn Restaurante.
 Choza de Margarita - an outdoor margarita bar with a wide variety of frozen margaritas, on-the-rocks margaritas and Mexican snacks, opened in November 2017

Live entertainment
 Mariachi Cobre

Shopping
Plaza de Los Amigos, a Mexican marketplace that sells products such as sombreros, ceramics, musical instruments such as maracas, bajas and The Three Caballeros' merchandise.

See also
 Epcot attraction and entertainment history

References

External links

 Walt Disney World Resort - Mexico Pavilion
 Walt Disney World Resort - Gran Fiesta Tour Starring the Three Caballeros
 Walt Disney World Resort - San Angel Inn
 Walt Disney World Resort - La Hacienda de San Angel
 Walt Disney World Resort - Mariachi Cobre

Walt Disney Parks and Resorts attractions
Epcot
Mexican-American culture in Florida
Mexico in fiction
World Showcase
1982 establishments in Florida